Itaberaí Esporte Clube is a football club in the city of Itaberaí, in the state of Goiás wed already disputed the third division of Campeonato Goiano.

History
Founded on July 5, 1955 in the city of Itaberaí in the state of Goiás, the club is affiliated to Federação Goiana de Futebol and has played in Campeonato Goiano (Second Division) three times and Campeonato Goiano (Third Division) two times.

Titles
 Campeonato Goiano (Third Division) (2014)

References 

Association football clubs established in 1955
Football clubs in Goiás